is a Japanese sailor. She competed in the women's 470 event at the 2004 Summer Olympics.

References

External links
 

1976 births
Living people
Japanese female sailors (sport)
Olympic sailors of Japan
Sailors at the 2004 Summer Olympics – 470
Place of birth missing (living people)